Keith Matthew Boxley (born January 2, 1962), better known as Keith Shocklee or Wizard K-Jee, is an American record producer and DJ. He was an original member of Public Enemy and the Bomb Squad. He has contributed his talent to several albums including It Takes A Nation Of Millions To Hold Us Back and Fear of a Black Planet. Shocklee also co-produced the singles "Bring the Noise” and "Fight The Power," which were included on Rolling Stone's list of the “500 Greatest Songs Of All Time.”

Early life 
Shocklee was born and raised in Roosevelt, New York. He was a childhood friend of rappers Chuck D and Flavor Flav.

Career
Shocklee began his career DJing at various parks, house parties and clubs in New York City during the early 1980s. He also cites Fatback Band's ""King Tim III (Personality Jock)" as the pioneering rap song that triggered his interest in recording. The Bomb Squad's first songs were produced in Shocklee's mother's basement and recorded on tape and acetate. He has since gone on to work with the following recording artists: LL Cool J, Ice Cube, Janet Jackson, Sinéad O'Connor and many other big-name acts. September, 21 2021 Keith announced his own imprint Spectrum City Records and will be releasing new music.

Discography 
The 7A3
 Coolin' in Cali (1988)
LL Cool J
 Walking with a Panther (1989)
3rd Bass
 The Cactus Album (1989)
Paula Abdul
 Cold Hearted Quiverin' (1989)
Public Enemy
 Welcome to the Terrordome (1989)
 Fight the Power (1989)
 Fear of a Black Planet (1990)
 He Got Game (1998)
K-9 Posse
 It Gets No Deeper (1989)
Young Black Teenagers
 Nobody Knows Kelli / Proud to be Black (1990)
 Young Black Teenagers (1991)
 Roll with the Flavor (1993)
 Dead Endz Kidz Doin' Lifetime Bidz (1993)
Bell Biv DeVoe
 Poison (1990)
 BBD (I Thought It Was Me)? (1990)
 Let Me Know Something?! (1991)
Ice Cube
 AmeriKKKa's Most Wanted (1990)
Son Of Bazerk
 Change the Style (1991)
Debelah
 Free (1994)
Film & Television Soundtracks
 House Party (1990)
 Juice (1991)
 Mo' Money (1992)
 The Meteor Man (1993)

References

External links 
 Keith Shocklee's Myspace
 
DJ Keith Shocklee Interview NAMM Oral History Library (2020)

1962 births
Living people
American hip hop record producers
People from Roosevelt, New York
American DJs
Record producers from New York (state)